The Gateway Conference was an intercollegiate athletic conference that existed from 1962 and 1975. Its membership included schools located in on the states of Illinois and Wisconsin. The formation of the Gateway Conference was announced in December 1961 with eight member schools: Eureka College in Eureka, Illinois, George Williams College in Chicago, Lakeland College—now known as Lakeland University—in Plymouth, Wisconsin, Milton College in Milton, Wisconsin, Northwestern College—which later merged into Martin Luther College—in Watertown, Wisconsin, Shimer College in Mount Carroll, Illinois, Trinity Christian College in Palos Heights, Illinois, and the University of Illinois—Navy Pier—now known as the University of Illinois at Chicago.

Football champions

1962 –  and 
1963 – 
1964 – 
1965 – 
1966 – 

1967 – 
1968 – 
1969 – 
1970 – 

1971 – 
1972 –  and 
1973 – 
1974 –  and

Basketball champions
1974–75 –  and

See also
List of defunct college football conferences

References